The Singapore Open is a badminton event that has been held in Singapore annually since 1929. Badminton World Federation categorized Singapore Open as one of the seven BWF World Tour Super 500 events in the BWF events structure since 2018. In 2023, the tournament will be upgraded to a Super 750 event.

In 1929, the Singapore Badminton Association (SBA) was established to promote the sport and organise competitions. Its first official annual open championships was held in that same year with the best players chosen to represent Singapore in the regional tournaments. In 1957, it became an open invitation championships and was held annually until 1973. In 1987–1989, the tournament was known as the Konica Cup, an invitation championships exclusively for Asian players, and in 1990, for the first time entered the International Badminton Federation Grand Prix circuit. In 2007, Singapore Open was part of the BWF Super Series event.

Venues for the Championships 
The tournament has been historically held at six main venues, and is now played at Singapore Indoor Stadium in Kallang, Singapore.

Past winners

Performances by nation

See also
 List of Singapore Open men's singles champions
 List of Singapore Open women's singles champions
 List of Singapore Open men's doubles champions
 List of Singapore Open women's doubles champions
 List of Singapore Open mixed doubles champions

Note

References

External links 
Official website
Smash: Singapore Open

 
Badminton tournaments in Singapore
Recurring sporting events established in 1929
1929 establishments in Singapore